Mandau is a river in central Europe.

Mandau may also refer to:
 Mandau River, a river northern Sumatra, Indonesia
 Mandau-class fast attack craft, a class of fast attack craft operated by the Indonesian Navy
 Mandau (knife), the traditional weapon of the Dayak people of Borneo